Pleasant Ridge is an unincorporated community in Marion Township, Jasper County, Indiana.

History
A post office was established at Pleasant Ridge in 1878, and remained in operation until it was discontinued in 1923. The community's name is descriptive.

Pleasant Ridge was made a station on the railroad built through that territory in the early 1880s.

Geography

References

Unincorporated communities in Jasper County, Indiana
Unincorporated communities in Indiana